The All-Union Leninist Young Communist League, usually known as Komsomol (()), a syllabic abbreviation of the Russian ), was a political youth organization in the Soviet Union. It is sometimes described as the youth division of the Communist Party of the Soviet Union (CPSU), although it was officially independent and referred to as "the helper and the reserve of the CPSU".

The Komsomol in its earliest form was established in urban areas in 1918. During the early years, it was a Russian organization, known as the Russian Young Communist League, or RKSM. During 1922, with the unification of the USSR, it was reformed into an all-union agency, the youth division of the All-Union Communist Party.

It was the final stage of three youth organizations with members up to age 28, graduated at 14 from the Young Pioneers, and at nine from the Little Octobrists.

History

Before the February Revolution of 1917 the Bolsheviks did not display any interest in establishing or maintaining a youth division, but the policy emphasis shifted in the following months.
After the Russian Civil War of 1917–1922 ended, the Soviet government under Lenin introduced a semi-capitalist economic policy to stabilize Russia’s floundering economy. This reform, the New Economic Policy (NEP), introduced a new social policy of moderation and discipline, especially regarding Soviet youth. Lenin himself stressed the importance of political education of young Soviet citizens in building a new society.

The first Komsomol Congress met in 1918 under the patronage of the Bolshevik Party, despite the two organizations' not entirely coincident membership or beliefs. Party intervention in 1922–1923 proved marginally successful in recruiting members by presenting the ideal Komsomolets (Komsomol youth) as a foil to the "bourgeois NEPman".  By the time of the second Congress, a year later, however, the Bolsheviks had, in effect, acquired control of the organization, and it was soon formally established as the youth division of the Communist party. However, the party was not very successful overall in recruiting Russian youth during the NEP period (1921–1928).

This came about because of conflict and disillusionment among Soviet youth who romanticised the spontaneity and destruction characteristic of War Communism (1918–1921) and the Civil War period. They saw it as their duty, and the duty of the Communist Party itself, to eliminate all elements of Western culture from society. However, the NEP had the opposite effect: after it started, many aspects of Western social behavior began to reemerge. The contrast between the "Good Communist" extolled by the Party and the capitalism fostered by NEP confused many young people. They rebelled against the Party's ideals in two opposite ways: radicals gave up everything that had any Western or capitalist connotations, while the majority of Russian youths felt drawn to the Western-style popular culture of entertainment and fashion. As a result, there was a major slump in interest and membership in the Party-oriented Komsomol.

By 1925 Komsomol had 1 million members, and many others were in theater groups for younger children. In March 1926, Komsomol membership reached a NEP-period peak of 1,750,000 members: only 6 percent of the eligible youth population. Only when Stalin came to power and abandoned the NEP in the first Five Year Plan (1928–1933) did membership increase drastically.  The youngest youth eligible for Komsomol membership were fourteen years old. The upper age-limit for ordinary personnel was twenty-eight, but Komsomol functionaries could be older. Younger children joined the allied Vladimir Lenin All-Union Pioneer Organization. While membership was nominally voluntary, those who failed to join had no access to officially sponsored holidays and found it very difficult (if not impossible) to pursue higher education.

The Komsomol had little direct influence on the Communist Party or on the government of the Soviet Union, but it played an important role as a mechanism for teaching the values of the CPSU to the younger generation. The Komsomol also served as a mobile pool of labor and political activism, with the ability to relocate to areas of high-priority at short notice. In the 1920s the Kremlin assigned Komsomol major responsibilities for promoting industrialization at the factory level. In 1929, 7,000 Komsomol cadets were building the tractor factory in Stalingrad (volgagrad), 57,000 others built factories in the Urals, and 36,500 were assigned work underground in the coal mines. The goal was to provide an energetic hard-core of Bolshevik activists to influence their coworkers the factories and mines that were at the center of communist ideology.

Active members received privileges and preferences in promotion. For example, Yuri Andropov, CPSU General Secretary (1982–1984), achieved notice through work with the Komsomol organization of Karelia in 1940–1944. At its largest, during the 1970s, the Komsomol had tens of millions of members. 

During the early phases of perestroika in the mid-1980s, when the Soviet authorities began cautiously introducing private enterprise, the Komsomol received privileges with respect to initiating businesses, with the motivation of giving youth a better chance. The government, unions and the Komsomol jointly introduced Centers for Scientific and Technical Creativity for Youth (1987). At the same time, many Komsomol managers joined and directed the Russian Regional and State Anti-Monopoly Committees. Folklore quickly coined a motto: "The Komsomol is a school of Capitalism", hinting at Vladimir Lenin's "Trade unions are a school of Communism".

The reforms of Mikhail Gorbachev, perestroika and glasnost, finally revealed that the quality of Komsomol management was bad. The Komsomol, long associated with conservatism and bureaucracy, had always largely lacked political power. The radical Twentieth Congress of the Komsomol (April 1987) altered the rules of the organization to represent a market orientation. However, the reforms of the Twentieth Congress eventually destroyed the Komsomol, with lack of purpose and the waning of interest, membership, and quality of membership. At the Twenty-second Congress of the Komsomol in September 1991, the organization was disbanded. The Komsomol's newspaper, Komsomolskaya Pravda, outlived the organization and is still published.

A number of youth organizations of successor parties to the CPSU continue to use the name Komsomol, as does the youth organization of Ukrainian communists: Komsomol of Ukraine.

The ideal Komsomolets

Not only was the ideal Communist youth an asset to his or her organization, but (s)he also "lived correctly". This meant that every aspect of a Komsomolets’s life was to be in accordance with Party doctrine. Smoking, drinking, religion, and any other activity the Bolsheviks saw as threatening were discouraged as "hooliganism". The Komsomol sought to provide its members with alternative leisure activities that promoted the improvement of society, such as volunteer work, sports, and political and drama clubs. These efforts proved largely unsuccessful, since the Bolshevik Party and the Komsomol were not in touch with Soviet youth's desires and thus were unable to address them. Soviet youth remained relatively politically unaware or uninterested during the NEP period.

Youth campaigns during the NEP period
In 1922, with the establishment of the New Economic Policy, the Soviet government changed their rhetoric directed towards the youth from a revolutionary, militaristic tone to one with emphasis on philosophical education through book-learning and stability of the state by peaceful means. The young communists were uninterested in these new principles, and mass culture campaigns became the most important tool used by the Komsomol as an attempt to retain membership during the 1920s.

One of the most popular campaigns was the Novyi Byt (The New Way of Life). At these assemblies, the leadership of the Komsomol promoted the values they considered to be the most important for the ideal young communist. The New Soviet Man was to be "a lively, active, healthy, disciplined youngster who subordinates himself to the collective and is prepared for and dedicated to learn, study, and work." By establishing strict guidelines to what they expected, the Komsomol was able to denounce the traits and habits they saw as being harmful to the youth. It condemned sexual promiscuity, drinking, smoking and general mischievous behavior, as it posed moral danger to the organization’s young members. The majority of the youth did not take this well, as unsavory activities were enticing to them. At a time when membership was at its lowest (1.7 million in 1925), the Komsomol harmed only itself, as this type of campaign further distanced the organization from their target audience.

The Komsomol also launched campaigns of an anti-religious nature. The new communist regime wished to dismantle the already limited control the Orthodox church had on society, and the young were generally more interested in seeing the upheaval of old traditions than their elders who had lived under the tsar’s rule. The Komsomol rallied members to march in the streets, declaring their independence from religion. Problems came when the enthusiastic youth took this passion too far. Open harassment of church members sprang up, and earned the Komsomol a negative image in the minds of older generations. When the League made attempts to draw back on their anti-religious rhetoric, Soviet youth became increasingly disinterested in the organization.

Youth reactions
Many youths were drawn to "hooliganism" and the Western culture of entertainment, which included cinema and fashion magazines. It is no coincidence that these youths were primarily from the peasantry or working class. They saw Western culture as a way to elevate or distinguish themselves from their humble beginnings. The Soviet authorities eventually made their own films with ideologically "pure" messages, but it was not the same. Soviet pictures, which were often informational or political, lacked the draw of Westerns or romances from Hollywood. Both the authorities and the youths themselves blamed the NEP for corrupting Soviet youth culture. Because the Komsomol was simply not as attractive to these young men and women, the government began to limit their cultural and entertainment options. This signalled the end of the NEP, and the end of the brief influx of Western culture in the Soviet Union before Stalin’s ascendancy.

Militant young Communists were a threat to the older Bolsheviks because they had the potential to undermine the new, NEP-based society. The shift from destruction of an old state to creation of a new one, mirrored by the shift from War Communism to the NEP, was necessary to maintain and stabilise the Bolshevik regime. The Party’s disapproval of young militants was necessary in order not only to define what was considered proper behavior, but also to maintain social and political control over the masses. However, after Stalin came to power and the NEP was abandoned in favor of the Five-Year Plans, many of the young socialists ideas were absorbed back into the mainstream and they no longer presented a problem.

Young women in the Komsomol
The ideology of the new Soviet government under Vladimir Lenin strove to break down societal barriers believed to be harmful to the goal of unity. Specifically, it hoped to elevate women to a level of equality with men. The Komsomol pushed hard to recruit young women and raise them in this new consciousness. In the period of the early 1920s, women primarily stayed at home and performed the majority of housework. Membership of the Komsomol seemed to offer a doorway into public life at a level previously unseen by women of the time. Young women enthusiastically joined as they were finally given a chance to detach themselves from the traditional patriarchal structure. Moreover, they were drawn to the Komsomol because it promised them an education during a time when young girls were deprived of a proper one in favor of preparing them for household duties. The Soviets encouraged women to take an active role in the new system and participate in the same activities and work as their male counterparts.

Major conflicts surfaced when the regime took these new steps. The Bolshevik Party was not the most popular at the time, and much of the rest of the nation wished to hold onto their patriarchal values. Parents hesitated to allow their daughters to join the youth organization, because "the Komsomol seemed like an immoral organization, for it removed young girls from adult control, and then required them to attend meetings held at night." Soviet citizens felt that if they released their hold on their children, they would be corrupted by the Komsomol’s influence. They also worried that if their daughters became independent and promiscuous, then no man would want to marry them. Moreover, parents wondered who would take care of the home if all the young women left home to join the Komsomol.

Women, generally, were also unprepared for the realities of the workforce. The ancient structure of female subordination allowed for little in terms of work experience. Men had been given better education and were traditionally raised to take part in military and industry. Therefore, they had a much wider range of opportunity than women whose only role had been caretaking. Here lies the irony of the regime’s efforts: the Komsomol tried desperately to empower young women to achieve equality, yet women’s perceptions of themselves worsened because they were now being directly compared to their much more prepared counterparts.

Even though the Communist Party preached and demanded equality, men dominated both the governing body and the Komsomol’s leadership. Upward mobility, contrary to initial belief, was incredibly hard for women to achieve. In addition, the organization openly encouraged its female members to pursue positions of teaching and nurturing of young Soviets.

Recruitment of peasant women
The Komsomol also found it difficult to recruit and motivate young women amongst the rural populations. During NEP, this demographic represented only 8% of the organization. Poor membership numbers from rural areas were the result of several different factors. By 1925, the failure to implement equality in the Komsomol was evident to young rural women, society still perceiving them to be inferior both because they were women and because they came from the peasant class. Various women’s organizations criticized the Komsomol for these failures. Chiefly, the Women’s Bureau of the Communist Party, known as Zhenotdel, openly criticized the youth organization. Komsomol women were provided little in the way of programs that might encourage their involvement. Annual conferences, where organization leaders gathered to discuss topics of interest to female members, were in fact the only activities in which early Komsomol women took part. The Youth League therefore made concerted efforts to resolve these issues and raise membership amongst peasant women.

Strategies for recruiting women in the 1920s
The Komsomol’s original tactic to recruit peasant women failed miserably. Representatives were sent to the countryside to reveal to potential recruits that they were being oppressed by male dominance, and that the youth organization provided them with an opportunity to recreate themselves as independent women. However, women did not rally to the League in the numbers that the organization hoped for. The Komsomol turned to the Zhenotdel, which was more favorable to young peasant women, and cooperated with them to achieve better results.  Another strategy was the addition of activities suited to the interests of the target demographic. Sewing and knitting classes became popular during the 1920s for rural Komsomol women. Additionally, educational classes, such as health and feminine hygiene were used to both draw more female members and alleviate concerns of rural parents. Peasant families were more inclined to allow their daughters to join the Komsomol since they knew they would be participating in beneficial programs rather than mischievous behaviors such as drinking and dancing.

Class issues in recruitment
Soldiers returning from the Civil War, students in provincial towns, and workers fleeing the poverty of the cities established the first rural Komsomol cells in 1918. Most administrators, who wanted to retain the "proletarian character" of the organization, did not initially welcome peasants into the Komsomol. However, it soon became obvious that peasants were too large a part of the population (80%) to ignore. Also, peasants, who were benefiting from the NEP’s compromise with small producers, were in a better position to join than workers, who struggled with unemployment and other economic problems and thus had less interest in joining.

Older peasants reacted negatively to the growth of the Komsomol in rural areas. They saw the administrators as intruders who prevented their children from fulfilling their family obligations. The Komsomol needed full-time commitment, and peasant youths, who saw it as a chance for social mobility, education, and economic success, were willing to abandon their traditional duties to join. At the end of NEP, the majority of Komsomol members were peasants, while the administration remained largely urban.

Both the urban and rural populations had problems with the Komsomol’s attempts to unify the two demographics. Rural parents believed that because the League’s administration was city-centered, their children would be negatively influenced by city dwellers. In addition, land-owning peasants were much more affected by the government’s revocation of private ownership, and many were uninterested in allowing their children to participate. For its part, the urban population viewed itself as superior to the peasants. They saw the rural members as backward and uneducated, and were angered by their swelling numbers.

Komsomol adopted meritocratic, supposedly class-blind membership policies in 1935, but the result was a decline in working-class youth members, and a dominance by the better educated youth.

Leaders (First Secretary of the Central Committee)

 Yefim Tsetlin (1918–1919)
 Oscar Ryvkin (1918–1921)
 Lazar Shatskin (1921–1922)
 Pyotr Smorodin (1922–1924)
 Nikolai Chaplin (1924–1928)
 Alexander Milchakov (1928–1929)
 Aleksandr Kosarev (1929–1938)
 Nikolai Mikhailov (1938–1952)
 Aleksandr Shelepin (1952–1958)
 Vladimir Semichastny (1958–1959)
 Sergei Pavlov (1959–1968)
  (1968–1977)
  (1977–1982)
  (1982–1986)
  (1986–1990)
  (1990–1991)

Branches 

 Armenian SSR: Հայաստանի լենինյան կոմունիստական երիտասարդական միություն, ՀԼԿԵՄ
 Azerbaijan SSR: Azərbaycan Lenin Kommunist Gənclər İttifaqı (Азәрбајҹан Ленин Коммунист Ҝәнҹләр Иттифагы), ALKGİ (АЛКҜИ)
 Byelorussian SSR: Ленінскі Камуністычны саюз моладзі Беларусі, ЛКСМБ
 Estonian SSR: Eestimaa Leninlik Kommunistlik Noorsooühing, ELKNÜ
 Georgian SSR:
 Karelo-Finnish SSR: Ленинский коммунистический союз молодежи Карело-Финской ССР, ЛКСМ КФССР
 Kazakh SSR:
 Kirghiz SSR:
 Latvian SSR: Latvijas Ļeņina Komunistiskā Jaunatnes Savienība, LĻKJS
 Lithuanian SSR: Lietuvos Lenino komunistinė jaunimo sąjunga, LLKJS
 Moldavian SSR: UTCLM (abbreviation)
 Russian SFSR: Ленинский коммунистический союз молодёжи РСФСР, ЛКСМ РСФСР
 Tajik SSR:
 Turkmen SSR:
 Ukrainian SSR: Ленінська Комуністична спілка молоді України, ЛКСМУ)
 Uzbek SSR: Ўзбекистон Ленинчи коммунистик ёшлар союзи, OʻzLKSM

Public safety 
 Voluntary People's Druzhina

Children's organization 
 Young Pioneer organization of the Soviet Union

Honors
The Komsomol received three Orders of Lenin, one Order of the Red Banner, one Order of the Red Banner of Labour, and one Order of the October Revolution. The asteroid 1283 Komsomolia is named after the Komsomol, as is Komsomolets Island in the Arctic Ocean. The Komsomolets armored tractor was a model used during the Second World War, while the first Soviet nuclear submarine was K-3 Leninsky Komsomol; a later submarine was called K-278 Komsomolets.

There are also several towns and cities named Komsomolsky, Komsomolets or Komsomolsk.

Gallery

See also
Communist Youth League of China
Ho Chi Minh Communist Youth Union

References
Notes

Further reading
 
 
 
 
 
 
 Hulicka, Karel;  "The Komsomol." Southwestern Social Science Quarterly (1962): 363-373. online
 Krylova, Anna. Soviet Women in Combat: A History of Violence on the Eastern Front (2010)
 Pilkington, Hilary. Russia's Youth and its Culture: A Nation's Constructors and Constructed (1995)

in Russian
 Il'insky, I. VLKSM v politicheskoi systeme sovetskogo obshchestva. (The VLKSM in the political system of Soviet society). Moscow: Molodaia gvardiia, 1981.  – In Russian.

External links
 
 Komsomol Russia
 Komsomol Ukraine
 Komsomol Moldova
 Komsomol Belarus
 Komsomol Kazakhstan

 
Organization of the Communist Party of the Soviet Union
Youth wings of communist parties
Youth organizations based in the Soviet Union
Youth organizations established in 1918
1918 establishments in Russia
Organizations disestablished in 1991
1991 disestablishments in the Soviet Union